David Blatherwick may refer to:

David Blatherwick (artist) (born 1960), Canadian artist
David Blatherwick (diplomat) (born 1941), retired British diplomat